Perri is a 1957 American adventure film from Walt Disney Productions, based on Felix Salten's 1938 Perri: The Youth of a Squirrel. It was the company's fifth feature entry in their True-Life Adventures series, and the only one to be labeled a True-Life Fantasy. In doing so, the Disney team combined the documentary aspects of earlier efforts with fictional scenarios and characters.

Description 
The story's title character is a young female squirrel who learns about forest life, and finds a mate in Porro, a male squirrel. In the film, there are seasons called the Time of Learning, Time of Beauty, Time of Peace, and Together Time. The story of the film was directly inspired by Felix Salten's 1938 novel Die Jogend des Eichornchens Perri, which Disney had secured the rights to in 1933.

The film was produced, narrated, and written by Winston Hibler, who had previously narrated Disney's True-Life Adventures series of documentaries. Perri was described as "True-Life Fantasy" to avoid confusion with True-Life Adventures.

Production 
Perri was shot over the course of three years. The footage used in the film was shot on 300,000 feet of 16mm film, which later edited down to 8,000 feet and converted to 35mm film. Parts of the film were shot in Salt Lake City and the Uinta National Forest in Utah. The film's score was written by Paul Smith, and the film was the first on-screen credit for Roy E. Disney, who worked as a photographer.

Reception 
Upon its release, Perri was generally well received by critics and audiences. Along with all the True-Life Adventures, it premiered in December 2006 on Disney DVD as part of the Legacy Collection. It was also one of the titles available on Disney+ when the subscription streaming service launched on November 12, 2019.

Awards
 1958 Berlin Film Festival: Golden Bear (Best Documentary)

See also
 List of American films of 1957

References

Literature
Maltin, Leonard (2000). The Disney Films, 4th ed., p. 142–144. Disney Editions. .

External links
 
 

1957 films
Disney documentary films
1950s English-language films
Films about squirrels
Documentary films about nature
Films produced by Winston Hibler
Films scored by Paul Smith (film and television composer)
Walt Disney Pictures films
Films shot in Utah
Films shot in Salt Lake City
Films based on works by Felix Salten
Films with screenplays by Winston Hibler
1950s American films